Borisovo (Borisov) is a rural locality (a village) in Gusevsky Selsoviet, Abzelilovsky District, Bashkortostan, Russia. The population was 60 as of 2010. There is 1 street.

Geography 
Borisovo is located 33 km southeast of Askarovo (the district's administrative centre) by road. Yangelskoye is the nearest rural locality.

References 

Rural localities in Abzelilovsky District